The election for Resident Commissioner to the United States House of Representatives took place on November 6, 1956 the same day as the larger Puerto Rican general election and the United States elections, 1956.

Candidates for Resident Commissioner
 Antonio Fernós-Isern for the Popular Democratic Party
 Antonio Ortíz Toro for the Republican Party
 Marco A. Ramirez for the Puerto Rican Independence Party

Election results

See also 
Puerto Rican general election, 1956

References 

Puerto Rico
1956